Isopullulanase is an enzyme with systematic name pullulan 4-glucanohydrolase (isopanose-forming). This enzyme catalyses the following chemical reaction

 Hydrolysis of pullulan to isopanose (6-alpha-maltosylglucose)

The enzyme has no activity on starch.

References

External links 
 

EC 3.2.1